Scurry Racing, Monmouth Show.A pair of ponies being driven in the scurry competition at the 2012

Scurry driving is a fast-paced equestrian sport in which a pair of ponies pull a carriage around a course of cones in an attempt to get the fastest time. The full name of the sport is Double Harness Scurry Driving.

Rules
The aim is to achieve the fastest time in getting around the track, without knocking any balls off the top of the cones that mark the course. For every ball that is knocked off, a time penalty in incurred. It is almost always done at a gallop. Due to the small distance between the cones (170 cm), accuracy is key. A course contains between 10 and 14 obstacles, such as a box and a slalom.

The ponies are normally given names of famous pairings, such as Tom & Jerry, Bonny & Clyde, Judge & Jury, Dun & Dusted and so on.

History 

Scurry driving developed in the 1960s from the American sport of chuck wagon racing. In the United Kingdom administration was at first by the British Horse Society, and later by the British Horse Driving Trials Association. In 2001 the Scurry Driving Association was formed and took over the organisation of events.

Scurry driving takes place in the US, Australia, New Zealand and Northern Europe. The European Championships take place in the Netherlands.

References

External links
 http://www.scurrydrivers.co.uk/
 http://www.scurryponies.org/
 http://www.osborne-ref.co.uk/osg/index.html
 http://www.orchard-scurry-team.co.uk
 http://www.scurrynz.co.nz
 http://www.scurrydriving.com

Horse driving
Sports originating in the United States